Meizu M1 Note is a smartphone by Meizu. It was announced in China on December 23, 2014 and released in the early January, 2015. Meizu m1 note is positioned as "Quality for young" device

Features
 5.5" 1080 x 1920px FullHD display of 403ppi
 Dual SIM (Micro-SIM, dual stand-by)
 Heavily customized Flyme OS 4 on top of Android 4.4.4 (KitKat)
 Octa-core 1.7 GHz Cortex-A53 chipset, 2GB of RAM
 13 MP rear camera, 4208 x 3120 pixels, autofocus, dual-LED (dual tone) flash
 5MP front-facing camera
 16GB or 32GB built-in storage
 Wi-Fi 802.11 a/b/g/n, dual-band, Wi-Fi Direct, hotspot
 Bluetooth v4.0, A2DP, LE
 A-GPS, GLONASS
 3,140mAh battery
 OTG supported

References

External links
Meizu M1 Note Official Webpage
Meizu M1 Note Review
Online Shopping For Electronics

Android (operating system) devices
Mobile phones introduced in 2014
M1 Note
Discontinued smartphones